The Salonga River is a river in the Democratic Republic of the Congo. It is a tributary of the Busira River.

Course

The river's name is said to come from a mispronunciation of "nsao'loonga", the local name of a bird.
The Salonga River meanders in a generally northwest direction through the Salonga National Park and on to its confluence with the Busira River.
It is navigable all year with 50 ton barges up to Watsi-Kengo.

Notes

Sources

Rivers of the Democratic Republic of the Congo